In electronics, a rubber diode or V multiplier is a bipolar junction transistor circuit that serves as a voltage reference.  It consists of one transistor and two resistors, and the reference voltage across the circuit is determined by the selected resistor values and the base-to-emitter voltage (V) of the transistor.  The circuit behaves as a voltage divider, but with the voltage across the base-emitter resistor determined by the forward base-emitter junction voltage.

It is commonly used in the biasing of push-pull output stages of amplifiers, where one benefit is thermal compensation: The temperature-dependent variations in the multiplier's V, approximately -2.2 mV/ºC, can be made to match variations occurring in the V of the power transistors by mounting to the same heat sink. In this context, it is sometimes called a bias servo.

References

Semiconductors